Angel James Dee III, professionally known as AJ Dee (born July 27, 1983) is a Filipino actor, model and swimmer. He is the brother of fellow swimmer and actor Enchong Dee.

Early life
While in high school, Dee participated in the Philippines' Palarong Pambansa and was picked to join the Philippine swimming team and participated in events in Hong Kong, Brunei, Singapore, and Taiwan.

Dee also participated in the Mossimo Bikini Summit and the Fashion Designers Association of the Philippines (FDAP)'s Body Shots Model Search.

Career
Dee became a co-host of the variety show MTB: Ang Saya Saya after becoming a runner-up on the show's "TV Idol UR D Man" contest. Previously, Dee had a small role in Basta't Kasama Kita and was one of the hosts of ABS-CBN's regional variety show Kilig Bicool!

Dee's first film appearance was in Star Cinema's Dreamboy in 2005. In the same year, he was cast in the primetime teleserye, Vietnam Rose and joined The Buzz as one of the hosts of the "Wanna Buzz" segment.

In 2014, Dee played Caleb, the half-wolf father of Meg Imperial's character, in Moon of Desire and appeared in docu-dramaSa Puso Ni Dok.

In 2015, he had a special participation in Bridges of Love and in Pasión de amor.

Aside from acting, Dee modeled for Bench and appeared in TV commercials. He also maintains a fashion blog—The Filo Dapper.

Personal life
Dee studied high school at Naga Hope Christian School and obtained his Bachelor of Science in Business Management degree at the Ateneo de Naga University. He is the older brother of Enchong Dee.

Dee is currently based in Norway with his Norwegian wife Olga Havran  and sons Maximus James and Alexandros Jayden.

Filmography

Television

Film

Theater

References

External links 
 
 The Filo Dapper

1983 births
Living people
Star Magic
ABS-CBN personalities
GMA Network personalities
Bicolano actors
People from Naga, Camarines Sur
Male actors from Camarines Sur
Participants in Philippine reality television series
Filipino male models
Filipino male television actors
Filipino male film actors